The 2013 All-Ireland Senior Football Championship was the 127th edition of the GAA's premier inter-county Gaelic football tournament, played between 31 counties of Ireland (excluding Kilkenny), London and New York. The 2013 All-Ireland Senior Football Championship Final was contested by Dublin and Mayo at Croke Park on 22 September 2013, with Dublin winning by 2:12 to Mayo's 1:14.

Several historic events of note occurred in the 2013 Championship. London won a Connacht Championship game for the first time in 36 years by defeating the Sligo side in the first round of the Connacht Senior Football Championship. They went on to reach the Connacht Final which they lost to Mayo, before progressing to play at Croke Park in a Round 4 All-Ireland Qualifier at which point they exited after the longest Championship run in their history.

Hawk-Eye was introduced for Championship matches at Croke Park and was first used to confirm that Offaly substitute Peter Cunningham's attempted point had gone wide 10 minutes into the second half of a game against Kildare. 2013 also brought the first Friday night game in the history of the Championship – a first round qualifier between Carlow and Laois.

The game of the Championship was the second All-Ireland semi-final, contested by Dublin and Kerry. The game featured six goals, three of which were scored by Kerry in the first half, two of these in the first eleven minutes of the game. Dublin also scored three goals, one in the first half and two in the second half, the second half goals coming in the final moments, to send them through to an All-Ireland final against Mayo, despite having been behind for much of the game. Many people hailed it as the greatest game of the modern era.

Teams 
A total of 33 teams contested the championship. These included 31 teams from Ireland, as well as London and New York. As in previous years, Kilkenny decided not to field a team.

Referees 
Ahead of the 2013 Championship, one referee was dropped for his incompetence: Michael Collins, the 2001 All-Ireland final referee, of Cork. Syl Doyle of Wexford had also chosen to step away the previous January. Their replacements were David Gough, who refereed the 2013 All-Ireland U21 final, of Meath and Fergal Kelly of Longford.

Padraig Hughes of Armagh remained injured after running into Eamonn Doherty and collapsing during live play in the NFL Division 1 clash between Donegal and Dublin in Ballybofey. Ciarán Brannigan of Down took the place of Hughes until his return to fitness.

2013 Championship referees' panel

 Ciarán Brannigan (Down)
 Barry Cassidy (Derry)
 David Coldrick (Meath)
 Maurice Deegan (Laois)

 Marty Duffy (Sligo)
 Michael Duffy (Sligo)
 Derek Fahy (Longford)
 David Gough (Meath)

 Rory Hickey (Clare)
 Martin Higgins (Fermanagh)
 Fergal Kelly (Longford)
 Eddie Kinsella (Laois)

 Conor Lane (Cork)
 Joe McQuillan (Cavan)
 Pádraig O'Sullivan (Kerry)
 Cormac Reilly (Meath)

All-Ireland final referee
 In place of Pádraig Hughes (Armagh) until Hughes returned from injury

Stadia and locations

Team summaries 

Against New York, Leitrim record their easiest win in history.

Championship format 
The All-Ireland Senior Football Championship of 2013 was run on a provincial basis as usual. It was a knockout tournament with pairings drawn at random in the respective provinces – there were no seeds.

Each match was played as a single leg. If a match was drawn there was a replay. If that match ended in a draw a period of extra time was played; however, if both sides were still level at the end of extra time another replay would have taken place.

Connacht Championship
Quarter-finals: (3 matches) These were three matches between six of the Connacht teams drawn first. The three winning teams advanced to the semi-finals, while the three losing teams entered the All-Ireland qualifiers.

Semi-finals: (2 matches) The winners of the three quarter-final games joined the other two Connacht teams to make up the semi-final pairings. The two winning teams advanced to the final, while the two losing teams entered the All-Ireland qualifiers.

Final: (1 match) The winners of the two semi-finals contested this game. The winning team advanced to the All-Ireland quarter-final, while the losing team entered the All-Ireland qualifiers.

Leinster Championship
Preliminary Round: (3 matches) These were three matches between six of the Leinster teams drawn first. The three winning teams advanced to the quarter-finals, while the three losing teams entered the All-Ireland qualifiers.

Quarter-finals: (4 matches) The winners of the three preliminary round games joined the other five Leinster teams to make up four quarter-final pairings. The four winning teams advanced to the semi-finals, while the four losing teams entered the All-Ireland qualifiers.

Semi-finals: (two matches) The four winners of the quarter-finals made up the semi-final pairings. The two winning teams advanced to the final, while the two losing teams entered the All-Ireland qualifiers.

Final: (one match) The winners of the two semi-finals contested this game. The winning team advanced to the All-Ireland quarter-final, while the losing team entered the All-Ireland qualifiers.

Munster Championship
Quarter-finals: (two matches) These were two matches between four of the Munster teams drawn first. The two winning teams advanced to the semi-finals, while the two losing teams entered the All-Ireland qualifiers.

Semi-finals (two matches): The winners of the two quarter-final games joined the other two Munster teams to make up the semi-final pairings. The two winning teams advanced to the final, while the two losing teams entered the All-Ireland qualifiers.

Final (one match): The winners of the two semi-finals contested this game. The winning team advanced to the All-Ireland quarter-final, while the losing team entered the All-Ireland qualifiers.

Ulster Championship
Preliminary Round: (1 match) This was a lone match between two of the Ulster teams drawn first. The winning team advanced to the quarter-finals, while the losing team entered the All-Ireland qualifiers.

Quarter-finals: (4 matches) The winners of the lone preliminary round game joined the other seven Ulster teams to make up four quarter-final pairings. The four winning teams advanced to the semi-finals, while the four losing teams entered the All-Ireland qualifiers.

Semi-finals: (2 matches) The four winners of the quarter-finals made up the semi-final pairings. The two winning teams advanced to the final, while the two losing teams entered the All-Ireland qualifiers.

Final: (1 match) The winners of the two semi-finals contested this game. The winning team advanced to the All-Ireland quarter-final, while the losing team entered the All-Ireland qualifiers.

Qualifiers
The qualifiers gave teams defeated in the provincial championships another chance at winning the All-Ireland title.

Round 1 (8 matches): the sixteen teams who failed to reach a provincial semi-final entered the qualifiers at this stage (New York do not compete). An open draw was made to determine the eight match pairings.

Round 2 (8 matches): the eight teams who failed to progress from their provincial semi-finals entered the qualifiers at this stage. They were paired with the eight winners from round 1 of the qualifiers. An open draw was made to determine the eight match pairings.

Round 3 (4 matches): the eight teams from round 2 of the qualifiers were paired against each other. An open draw was made to determine the four match pairings.

Round 4 (4 matches): the four teams who lost their provincial finals entered the qualifiers at this stage. They were paired with the four winners from round 3 of the qualifiers. An open draw was made to determine the four match pairings. The four winners advanced to the All-Ireland quarter-finals.

All-Ireland Series
Quarter-finals: (4 matches) the four teams from round 4 of the qualifiers were paired against the four provincial winners. An open draw was made to determine the four match pairings. The four winning teams advanced to the semi-finals, while the two losing teams were eliminated from the championship.

Semi-finals: (2 matches) The four winners of the quarter-finals make up the semi-final pairings. The two winning teams advanced to the final, while the two losing teams were eliminated from the championship.

Final: (1 match) The winners of the two semi-finals contested this game.

Provincial championships

Connacht Senior Football Championship

Leinster Senior Football Championship

Munster Senior Football Championship

Ulster Senior Football Championship

All-Ireland qualifiers

Round 1 
The first round consisted of all teams that failed to reach their respective provincial semi-finals. The following 16 teams entered the first round of the qualifiers.

Connacht (2)
 Galway
 Sligo

Leinster (7)
 Carlow
 Laois
 Longford
 Louth
 Offaly
 Westmeath
 Wicklow

Munster (2)
 Limerick
 Tipperary

Ulster (5)
 Antrim
 Armagh
 Derry
 Fermanagh
 Tyrone

The draw for the first round took place on Monday 17 June. It was aired on RTÉ Radio 1's Morning Ireland.

Round 2 
The second round saw the addition of teams beaten in the provincial semi-finals. The teams added were;

Connacht
 Leitrim
 Roscommon

Leinster
 Kildare
 Wexford

Munster
 Clare
 Waterford

Ulster
 Cavan
 Down

The draw for the second round took place on Monday 1 July, and was broadcast on TV3's Ireland AM.

Round 3 
The third round saw the teams that had made it through Round 2 play against each other. The draw for the third-round games took place on Monday 15 July and, as with the Round 1 draw, was aired on RTÉ Radio 1's Morning Ireland.

Round 4 
The fourth round was contested by all the teams that made it through the third round and the beaten finalists of each provincial championship. The beaten finalists were;

Connacht
London

Leinster
Meath

Munster
Cork

Ulster
Donegal

The draw for Round 4 took place on Monday 15 July along as with the Round 3 draw, with the teams in Round 3 knowing who they would face if they progressed.

All-Ireland 
The draw for the quarter-finals took place live draw on RTÉ Radio 1 on Saturday 27 July, immediately after the last of the Round 4 Qualifiers concluded.

Quarter-finals

Semi-finals

Final

Championship statistics 

All scores correct as of 23 September 2013

Scoring 

First goal of the championship: Rob Lowe for Leitrim against New York (Connacht quarter-final)
Widest winning margin: 27 points
Armagh 8-13 – 0-10 Leitrim (qualifier round 2)
Most goals in a match: 8
Armagh 8-13 – 0-10 Leitrim (qualifier round 2)
Most points in a match: 42
Derry 0-20 – 1-22 Cavan (qualifier round 3)
Most goals by one team in a match: 8
Armagh 8-13 – 0-10 Leitrim (qualifier round 2)
 Highest aggregate score: 47 points
Armagh 8-13 – 0-10 Leitrim (qualifier round 2)
Dublin 3-18 – 3-11 Kerry (All Ireland semi-final)
Lowest aggregate score: 17 points
Antrim 0-6 – 0-11 Monaghan (Ulster quarter-final)
Most goals scored by a losing team: 3
Dublin 3-18 – 3-11 Kerry (All Ireland semi-final)

Miscellaneous 

 London reach the Connacht final for the first time ever, after having 2 wins for the first time in the Connacht championship since 1977.
 Monaghan won their first Ulster title since 1988
 Cavan reached the All-Ireland quarter-finals for the first time.

Top scorers 

Season

Single game

Awards 
Monthly

Sunday Game Team of the Year
The Sunday Game team of the year was picked on 22 September, the night of the final and included six of Dublin's winning team.
Dublin's Michael Darragh MacAuley was named as the Sunday Game player of the year.

Stephen Cluxton (Dublin)
Colin Walshe (Monaghan)
Rory O'Carroll (Dublin)
Keith Higgins (Mayo)
Lee Keegan (Mayo)
Cian O'Sullivan (Dublin)
Colm Boyle (Mayo)
Aidan O'Shea (Mayo)
Michael Darragh MacAuley (Dublin)
Paul Flynn (Dublin)
Colm Cooper (Kerry)
Seán Cavanagh (Tyrone)
James O'Donoghue (Kerry)
Bernard Brogan (Dublin)
Cillian O'Connor (Mayo)

GAA/GPA All Stars
On 8 November, the All Star football team for 2013 was announced and the players were presented with their awards at Croke Park.

 Player has previously been selected.

County breakdown
 Dublin = 6
 Mayo = 4
 Monaghan = 2
 Kerry = 2
 Tyrone = 1

List of nominees

Media 
In December 2013, SAM 13 a double DVD was released containing highlights of the 2013 football championship season along with full match coverage of the final and Dublin v Kerry semi-final.

See also 
 2013 All-Ireland Minor Football Championship
 2013 All-Ireland Under-21 Football Championship

References